On the Scent may refer to

 On the Scent (installation), a theatrical piece of olfactory art
 Skunked Again, which was released with an alternative title